Black Island is a tidal island located just east of Darien, Georgia. It currently has a private gated residential community that is surrounded by native woodlands and marshes.

History 
The island was once used as a lookout for Fort King George. Later it was used as a hunting preserve for R. J. Reynolds, Jr., who lived at a mansion on Sapelo Island.

References 

Barrier islands of Georgia (U.S. state)
Islands of McIntosh County, Georgia